The following elections occurred in the year 1808.

North America

United States
United States House of Representatives elections in New York, 1808
1808 and 1809 United States House of Representatives elections
1808 United States presidential election
1808 and 1809 United States Senate elections

 
1808
Elections